Obolcola is a genus of moths in the family Geometridae erected by Francis Walker in 1861.

References

Geometridae